D28 is a state road in the central Croatia connecting the D5 and D45 in Veliki Zdenci to the D10 in Gradec interchange.  The road is  
The road, as well as all other state roads in Croatia, is managed and maintained by Hrvatske ceste, a state-owned company.

Traffic volume 

Traffic is regularly counted and reported by Hrvatske ceste, one of the operators of the road.

Road junctions and populated areas

Maps

Sources

D028
D028
D028
D028